Bozhkovo is a rural locality (a selo) in Alexeyevsky District, Belgorod Oblast, Russia. The population was 116 in 2010. There are five streets.

Geography 
Bozhkovo is located 23 km southeast of Alexeyevka (the district's administrative centre) by road. Shkuropatov and Nemenushchy are the nearest rural localities.

References 

Rural localities in Alexeyevsky District, Belgorod Oblast
Biryuchensky Uyezd